This is a list of mayors of Roswell, Georgia, United States.

Sources
Roswell, A Pictorial History, Roswell Historical Society, Darlene M. Walsh (Editor), 2nd Edition, 1994, p. 253, .

Roswell
Mayors